Adolfo León Gómez (19 September 1857 – 9 June 1927) was a Colombian poet, jurist and politician born in Pasca, Cundinamarca.  He was a grandson of Josefa Acevedo de Gomez, the first secular woman writer in Colombia. His three act play in verse El Soldado, related to the decisive battle of La Humareda, and the end of the Colombian civil war of 1884-1885, gave life to the popular pasillo "El Soldado".

Works
El soldado: drama histórico 1892

Further reading
Sánchez López, Luis María: Diccionario de escritores colombianos, - 2a. ed. - Barcelona: Plaza & Janes, 1982

References

1857 births
1927 deaths
Colombian male writers